Omar Khaiyyam is a Hindi language film. It was released in 1946, directed by Mohan Sinha. The film was based on life of famous Mathematician, Astronomer, Philosopher and Poet Omar Khayyam. The film was directed by Mohan Sinha. Music was by Lal Mohammad.

Cast
 K. L. Saigal as Omar Khayyam
 Suraiya as Mehru
 Wasti as Ghayasbeg
 Benjamin as Sultan
 Shakir as Vazir
 Madan Puri as Anwar
 Muzzmil as Zafar
 Leela

Soundtrack
The music composed by Lal Mohammed with lyrics written by Dr. Safdar Aah Sitapuri.

 Allaah Hu Khayyaam Hai Allaah Waalaa Matawaalaa - K. L. Saigal
 Aye Sufi Allah Wale - Suraiya
 Bedard Zaraa Sun Le Garibon Ki Kahaani - Suraiya
 Hare Bhare Baag Ke Phulon Pe Rijhaa Khayyaam - K. L. Saigal
 Insaan Kyon Rotaa Hai Insaan - K. L. Saigal
 Jal Ke Kuch Kehta Hai - Suraiya
 Khayyam Hai Allah Wala Matwala - Suraiya

References

External links
 

1946 films
1940s Hindi-language films
Indian drama films
1946 drama films
Indian black-and-white films
Hindi-language drama films